Sofia Shapatava and Anna Tatishvili were the defending champions, but Tatishvili chose to compete at the Lorraine Open. Shapatava teamed up with Anastasiya Vasylyeva as the third seeds, but lost to Gabriela Dabrowski and Mariana Duque in the semifinals.

Dabrowski and Duque went on to win the tournament, defeating Verónica Cepede Royg and Stephanie Vogt in the final, 6–4, 6–2.

Seeds

Draw

References 

 Draw

Reinert Open - Doubles
Reinert Open